Kenty Creek may refer to:

Kenty Creek (Alaska), a stream in Alaska
Kenty Creek (Mississippi), a stream in Mississippi